The 2007 Nigerian Senate election in Yobe State was held on 21 April 2007, to elect members of the Nigerian Senate to represent Yobe State. Ahmad Lawan representing Yobe North and Bukar Ibrahim representing Yobe East won on the platform of All Nigeria Peoples Party, while Adamu Garba Talba representing Yobe South won on the platform of the Peoples Democratic Party.

Overview

Summary

Results

Yobe North 
The election was won by Ahmad Lawan of the All Nigeria Peoples Party.

Yobe East 
The election was won by Bukar Ibrahim of the All Nigeria Peoples Party.

Yobe South 
The election was won by Adamu Garba Talba of the Peoples Democratic Party.

References 

April 2007 events in Nigeria
Yobe State Senate elections
Yob